Urşi may refer to several villages in Romania:

 Urşi, a village in Leleasca Commune, Olt County
 Urşi, a village in Popeşti Commune, Vâlcea County
 Urşi, a village in Stoilești Commune, Vâlcea County

See also 
 Urs (disambiguation)
 Ursu (surname)
 Ursoaia (disambiguation)